itouch may refer to:
 A Logitech keyboard series released in approximately 1998
 The parent Company of Ostrich Media, a provider of interactive television services
 The Pasen iTouch, a touchscreen Portable media player
 An unofficial nickname for the Apple iPod Touch